De Vuelta en la Trampa (Back in the Trap) is a studio album by Lalo Rodríguez released in 1992.

Track listing

References

1992 albums
Lalo Rodríguez albums